George Hall Wilde (March 16, 1923 – May 26, 1975) was an American football halfback and defensive back in the National Football League for the Washington Redskins.  He was born in Olney, Texas, and played college football at Texas A&M University and Texas Christian University.

External links
 
 

1923 births
1975 deaths
People from Olney, Texas
American football halfbacks
American football defensive backs
Texas A&M Aggies football players
Washington Redskins players